Silver Cross is a British nursery brand and manufacturer of baby transport and other baby-related products founded in 1877. The company, based in Skipton, North Yorkshire, United Kingdom, and is best known for the production of baby prams and pushchairs, particularly coach-built prams. Silver Cross is also a manufacturer of infant car seats, nursery furniture, nursery bedding, nursery decor, toys and gifts. The brand now sells its products in over 70 countries. Its parent company is the Chinese conglomerate Fosun International, who owns 87.2 per cent equity.

History

Founding and Wilsonera 
In 1877, Silver Cross is founded in Hunslet, Leeds, England by William Wilson. Wilson's prams utilized a spring system and a reversible hood, which he began manufacturing in a factory on Silver Cross Street, Leeds. In 1897, Wilson opened a factory on Whitehouse Street, Leeds. The following decade, Wilson registers for over 30 patents for pram design. Not long after receiving a Royal Warrant for pram production, William Wilson died aged 58 and ownership passed to his 3 sons; James, Irwin and Alfred.

20th century growth 
In the 1920s and 1930s, the Wilson brothers supplied a Silver Cross baby carriage to George VI and Queen Elizabeth. By 1936 Silver Cross had moved to a larger factory in Guiseley.

In the 1940s and 1950s Silver Cross adapts and develops new techniques for pram production. Plywood bodies are replaced with aluminium and new rubber die presses, spot welding machines, conveyor stoves and other state-of-the-art equipment is installed at the Silver Cross Works. The Queen chose a Silver Cross pram for Prince Charles in 1948. In 1951 Silver Cross launched a series of new iconic shaped prams, the forefathers of the modern day Balmoral pram. Posters of the time portray Silver Cross prams alongside Rolls-Royce cars, leading to the unofficial title 'the Rolls-Royce of Prams'.

During the 1960s, Silver Cross prams were seen as unfashionable, and old-fashioned compared to the changing consumer culture of the time.

The introduction of a chromium plating plant in 1964 and development of the product range. The range further extended into highchairs and furniture.

In 1977, Silver Cross reached its centenary, and a pram was presented to Princess Anne for her first child, Peter Philips.

During the 1980s and 1990s, Silver Cross launched the hugely successful Wayfarer pushchair, a lightweight pushchair with a large integrated shopping basket beneath a reversible seat. The Wayfarer sold over a million units.

21st century & ownership changes 
By 2002, the company was faring poorly, financially, and was sold to Alan Halsall in 2002 for just £500,000. While Halsall kept the company's line of "Heritage" pushchairs featuring the older designs, most of the company's sales came from more modern designs, such as car seats. Additionally, Halsall wanted Silver Cross to partner with other "complementary" British manufacturers, such as furniture makers and toy makers. Halsall also focused on expanding the company into new international markets, particularly to Asian districts like China, Hong Kong, South Korea, Malaysia and Singapore.

On 20 July 2015 Fosun International announced it had purchased the company from Halsall. As of 2017, Fosun owned 87.23% of the company.

In October 2016, the company announced their expansion into the United States via ABC Expo, a trade show for children's products. In August 2017, a collection of contemporary Silver Cross dolls prams and pushchairs was launched in association with Play Like Mum.

Coach-built prams

Silver Cross is well known for the manufacture of traditional coach-built prams, characterised by a hard body, C-spring suspension, spoked wheels and folding hood. This method of pram building was pioneered by William Wilson, an engineer and inventor from Leeds, England. Wilson went on to establish Silver Cross in 1877, marketing this type of coach-built baby carriage, and registering numerous patents for perambulator design in order to protect his unique invention. Despite refinements in techniques and manufacturing processes, the method of pram building today remains very similar to early pram building, with body panels being pressed from aluminium, riveted together and then painted to a high gloss finish. The body is then hand upholstered with a pram bed, and also decorated with fine line detail (in kind with fine lines applied to the coachwork of horse-drawn carriages - hence the term coach-built pram). The fine lines are hand painted and require considerable skill to apply. The steel suspension of the pram is hand bent around a specially shaped form in order to create the C-shaped suspension members, which are then attached to the body using leather straps. It is the C-spring suspension and leather straps that create the unique coach-built pram 'bounce'. The spoked wheels (traditionally chromed) are then attached to the suspension to complete the rolling chassis. Traditional pram wheels are large in diameter to further enhance the smooth ride. A folding fabric hood, pushing handle and covering fabric apron are then attached to the pram to complete the build. Silver Cross also manufactures a collection of coach-built dolls prams, which are scaled-down replicas of the full size prams. The dolls prams are made in exactly the same way as the real prams with the same coachwork, spoked wheels and folding hood. Silver Cross currently manufactures two models of full-size coach-built pram in the UK, the Balmoral and the Kensington, as well as two models of dolls pram, the Oberon and the Chatsworth. Silver Cross is the only pram manufacturer still producing coach-built prams in the UK.

Contemporary products

The main focus of the Silver Cross range is its modern travel collection, which incorporates a collection of 3-in-1 combination pram systems. This type of pram is characterised by its ability to be converted from a lie flat pram, to a pushchair, to a travel system (with the addition of a baby car seat). In addition to its combination prams, Silver Cross also produces infant car seats (that combine with the pram travel systems), as well as lightweight umbrella-fold pushchairs, nursery furniture collections, nursery bedding and decor items, and a range of toys and gifts including classic teddy bears and traditional rag dolls. In 2013 Silver Cross entered into a partnership with classic British automotive brand Aston Martin to produce a special edition of the Surf pram and pushchair (one of the prams in the Silver Cross travel collection). The Surf Aston Martin Edition was manufactured with features found on Aston Martin sports cars, such as alloy wheels, suede seats and an Alcantara leather handle. The Aston Martin Edition Surf was produced in a limited run of 800 worldwide.

References

Manufacturing companies of the United Kingdom
Baby products
British companies established in 1877
Companies based in Leeds
British Royal Warrant holders
Companies based in Craven District